Chapel Christian Academy was an educational ministry of Limerick Chapel in Limerick Township, Pennsylvania. The school provided a Fundamentalist Christian education to students in grades K–12.

The Academy, better known as "CCA" by its students, was founded in 1974 as a ministry of Limerick Chapel, and as a part of the Christian School movement. Parents were encouraged to remove their children from the public school system due to lack of Biblical influence in the public school curriculum. The Academy was based on the Bible being the inerrant word of God; creationism was the basis of all scientific teaching at the school.

The school began with grades 1–6 and each year added a grade. In 1981, the academy had its first graduating class. Graduates from Chapel Christian Academy were encouraged to attend Fundamentalist Christian colleges such as Bob Jones University, Pensacola Christian College, also primarily encouraging studies in Teaching, Missions, and Music. The Academy had three major divisions: Elementary (K–6), Junior High (7–8), and High School (9–12).

Chapel Christian Academy was a member of the Keystone Christian Education Association and well known for always placing highly in the annual KCEA State Competition. The school thrived with a strong Senior High Choir, Junior High Choir, and eventually four levels of Handbell Choirs. The Academy students were viewed by their local Christian school peers as one of the higher levels of KCEA State Competition to compete against.

Chapel sports consisted of basketball, soccer, baseball (boys), and volleyball (girls). The school mascot was the Cougar, and a beautiful lifelike depiction was painted on the gym wall.

Financial problems plagued the church and school for years creating a division that caused a large number of parents and students to leave due to the disagreement which then caused the decision to close the Academy. The Academy resorted to a mainly computer-taught system in the 2006–2007 school year and finally closed its doors at the close of that school year.

External links
Limerick Chapel website

Defunct Christian schools in the United States
Defunct schools in Pennsylvania
Educational institutions disestablished in 2007
Educational institutions established in 1974
Private high schools in Pennsylvania
Schools in Montgomery County, Pennsylvania
1974 establishments in Pennsylvania